Italian Hockey League - Serie A, formerly known as Serie A, is the top tier of professional ice hockey in Italy, which first began play in 1925. They are conducted under the authority of the Federazione Italiana Sport del Ghiaccio (FISG). The league initially merged with the Inter-National League to become the Alps Hockey League in 2016. Italian teams in the Alps Hockey League also compete in the Italian Hockey League - Serie A.

The league was known as Elite.A during the 2013–14 season, and as Italian Hockey League - Elite during the 2017–18 season.

Playing format
First part: "Regular season" - Every team plays four matches (2 home and 2 on the road) against each other. Team points are then halved and the second part begins.
Second part: "Master round/Relegation round" - Teams are divided into two groups, the master round (Group A) with the top 4 teams and the relegation round (Group B) with the last 5 teams. Every team plays two matches (1 home and 1 on the road) against the teams of its group. In the end, the final standings determine the playoff tree. 8 teams access to the playoff: the 4 teams in Group A and the best 4 teams in Group B). The last one of the relegation round ends the season sooner but it won't play in the lower division next year, since no movements from one division to another are foreseen.
Third part: "Play Off" - Quarterfinals: 1A vs 4B, 2A vs 3B, 3A vs 2B, 4A vs 1B. Quarterfinals, semifinals and finals will be played at the best of 5.

Points: Win 2 points - Tie 1 point

Serie A champions

1925 - HC Milano
1926 - HC Milano
1927 - HC Milano
1928 - No championship
1929 - No championship
1930 - HC Milano
1931 - HC Milano
1932 - SG Cortina
1933 - HC Milano
1934 - HC Milano
1935 - HC Diavoli Rossoneri Milano
1936 - HC Diavoli Rossoneri Milano
1937 - ADG Milano
1938 - AC Milanese DG ¹
1939 - No championship
1940 - No championship
1941 - AC Milanese DG ¹
1942 - No championship
1943 - No championship
1944 - No championship
1945 - No championship
1946 - No championship
1947 - HC Milano
1948 - HC Milano
1949 - HC Diavoli Rossoneri Milano
1950 - HC Milano
1951 - HC Milano Inter
1952 - HC Milano Inter
1953 - HC Diavoli Rossoneri Milano
1954 - HC Milano Inter
1955 - HC Milano Inter
1956 - No championship
1957 - SG Cortina
1958 - Milan-Inter HC ¹
1959 - SG Cortina
1960 - Diavoli HC Milano ¹
1961 - SG Cortina
1962 - SG Cortina
1963 - HC Bolzano
1964 - SG Cortina
1965 - SG Cortina
1966 - SG Cortina
1967 - SG Cortina
1968 - SG Cortina
1969 - HC Gherdëina
1970 - SG Cortina
1971 - SG Cortina
1972 - SG Cortina
1973 - HC Bolzano
1974 - SG Cortina
1975 - SG Cortina
1976 - HC Gherdëina
1977 - HC Bolzano
1978 - HC Bolzano
1979 - HC Bolzano
1980 - HC Gherdëina
1981 - HC Gherdëina
1982 - HC Bolzano
1983 - HC Bolzano
1984 - HC Bolzano
1985 - HC Bolzano
1986 - HC Merano
1987 - AS Mastini Varese Hockey
1988 - HC Bolzano
1989 - AS Mastini Varese Hockey
1990 - HC Bolzano
1991 - HC Milano Saima
1992 - HC Devils Milano
1993 - HC Devils Milano
1994 - AC Milan Hockey ²
1995 - HC Bolzano
1996 - HC Bolzano
1997 - HC Bolzano
1998 - HC Bolzano
1999 - HC Merano
2000 - HC Bolzano
2001 - Asiago Hockey AS
2002 - HC Milano Vipers
2003 - HC Milano Vipers
2004 - HC Milano Vipers
2005 - HC Milano Vipers
2006 - HC Milano Vipers
2007 - SG Cortina
2008 - HC Bolzano
2009 - HC Bolzano
2010 - Asiago Hockey
2011 - Asiago Hockey
2012 - HC Bolzano
2013 - Asiago Hockey
2014 - Ritten Sport
2015 - Asiago Hockey
2016 - Ritten Sport
2017 - Ritten Sport
2018 - Ritten Sport
2019 - Ritten Sport
2020 - Asiago Hockey
2021 - Asiago Hockey
2022 - Asiago Hockey
2023 - SG Cortina

¹ AC Milanese DG, Milan-Inter HC and Diavoli HC Milano are teams which were born from the disbanding of HC Milano & HC Diavoli Rossoneri Milano.
² HC Devils Milano adopted the name 'AC Milan Hockey' for the 1993-94 season.

Notable players

Foreigners

Craig Adams
Éric Bélanger
Ryan Christie
Matt Cullen
Mathieu Dandenault
Chris DiDomenico
Magnus Eriksson
Rico Fata
Dmitri Gogolev
David Haas
Greg Hawgood
Niklas Hjalmarsson
Jaromír Jágr
Jari Kurri
Bob Manno
Steve McKenna
Frank Nigro
Dušan Pašek
Steve Passmore
Fernando Pisani
Stéphane Quintal
Cliff Ronning
Blaine Stoughton
Mikhail Vasiliev
Ken Yaremchuk

Italians

Jim Corsi
Jason Muzzatti
Gaetano Orlando
Mike Rosati
Michele Strazzabosco
Lucio Topatigh
Carter Trevisani
Bruno Zarrillo

References

External links

Official website of the Italian Ice Hockey League (in Italian and German)
 Official statistics on powerhockey.info
Official website of the Italian Ice Sports Federation - Ice Hockey section (in Italian)
Tuttohockey - News and statistics from around the league (in Italian)
HockeyTime - News and interviews from around the league (in Italian)
Südtirol on Ice - News, tables and discussions from around Italian hockey with a focus on South Tyrol-based teams (in German)
Serie A on eurohockey.com
Serie A on eliteprospects.com

 
Professional ice hockey leagues in Italy
Top tier ice hockey leagues in Europe
Sports leagues established in 1925
1925 establishments in Italy